Derbyana matthewsi is a species of beetle in the family Dermestidae, the only species in the genus Derbyana.

References

Dermestidae